Heinrich Christoph Fehling (1653–1725) was a German painter born at Sangerhausen, in Thuringia. He was instructed by Bottschildt, to whom he was related. After having lived several years in Italy, he was appointed court-painter to the Elector John George IV, and became director of the Academy and inspector of the Art Galleries at Dresden, where he died in 1725. In the Dresden Gallery is a portrait by him of Colonel Wolf Caspar von Klengel, and a number of painted ceilings remain as specimens of his art in the palaces of that city.

References
 

1653 births
1725 deaths
17th-century German painters
German male painters
18th-century German painters
18th-century German male artists
Court painters
People from Sangerhausen